The Arno is a river in the Tuscany region of Italy.

Arno may also refer to:

People
Arno (name), including a list of people and fictional characters with the surname and given name
Arno (singer) (Arnold Charles Ernest Hintjens, 1949–2022), Belgian singer 
Arno of Salzburg (c. 750–821), bishop and archbishop of Salzburg

Places
Arno (department), a former département of the First French Empire in present-day Italy
Arno, Missouri, U.S.
Arno, Virginia, U.S.
Arnö, Nyköping Municipality, Sweden
Arno Atoll, Marshall Islands
Arno Bay, South Australia
Arno Vale in Arnold, Nottinghamshire, England

Other uses
Arno (automobile), a 1908 English automobile
Arno (typeface), a serif type family
Arno (ship), launched 1893
, a Royal Navy destroyer
Arno XI, a Ferrari-engined hydroplane
Arno, a Brazilian home appliance company owned by Groupe SEB.

See also

Arlo (disambiguation)